Leptosiphon aureus is a species of flowering plant in the phlox family known by the common name golden linanthus.

It has been reclassified by the USDA and the Jepson Manual (TJM2) from a binomial nomenclature to two subspecies: Leptosiphon aureus var. aureus for the majority of populations, and Leptosiphon aureus subsp. decorus for a smaller range of populations.

Description
Leptosiphon aureus is an annual herb producing a thin, threadlike stem with occasional leaves divided into narrow needlelike lobes. The oppositely arranged leaves are each divided into very narrow bristlelike lobes up to a centimeter long.

The tip of the stem has an inflorescence of usually a single flower with corolla lobes under a centimeter long. With the two subspecies: ssp. aureus generally has bright to golden yellow flowers; while ssp. decorus has white or cream blooms.  The bloom period is March to June.

Subspecies
Two subspecies, currently replacing the binomial species name in taxonomy, overlap in geography but do not occur together.
Leptosiphon aureus ssp. aureus — pinyon-juniper woodlands, madrean pine-oak woodlands in Madrean Sky Islands, and desert flats.
Leptosiphon aureus subsp. decorus —  endemic to Mojave Desert in California.

Distribution and habitat
The plant is native to the Southwestern United States in Arizona, Nevada, New Mexico, and Southern California; and to northwestern Mexico in Baja California state.

It grows in desert flats and desert chaparral of the Mojave Desert and Sonoran Desert; in chaparral and woodlands of the Peninsular Ranges and Transverse Ranges; and in pinyon-juniper woodlands and madrean pine-oak woodlands of Madrean Sky Islands.

References

External links
Calflora Database: Leptosiphon aureus (Golden linanthus)
Jepson Manual eFlora (TJM2) treatment of Leptosiphon aureus
UC CalPhotos gallery: Leptosiphon aureus ssp. aureus
UC CalPhotos gallery: Leptosiphon aureus  ssp. decorus

aureus
Flora of the Southwestern United States
Flora of California
Flora of Baja California
Flora of New Mexico
Flora of the California desert regions
Flora of the Sonoran Deserts
Natural history of the California chaparral and woodlands
Natural history of the Colorado Desert
Natural history of the Mojave Desert
Natural history of the Peninsular Ranges
Natural history of the Transverse Ranges
Flora without expected TNC conservation status